Ripe San Ginesio is a comune (municipality) in the Province of Macerata in the Italian region Marche, located about  south of Ancona and about  southwest of Macerata.

Ripe San Ginesio borders the following municipalities: Colmurano, Loro Piceno, San Ginesio, Sant'Angelo in Pontano.

References

External links
 Official website

Cities and towns in the Marche